The 2015–16 season was Bournemouth's first season in the Premier League (and their first ever season in the top-flight of English football) after gaining promotion in the previous season in their 126th year in existence. This season Bournemouth participate in the Premier League, FA Cup and League Cup. The season covers the period from 1 July 2015 to 30 June 2016.

Squad

Statistics

|}

Goals record

Disciplinary Record

Transfers

Transfers in

Total spending:  £37,000,000

Transfers out

Loans in

Loans out

Pre-season friendlies
On 2 June 2015, AFC Bournemouth announced they would travel to the United States to face the Philadelphia Union of Major League Soccer on 14 July 2015. A day later the club announced they would face French Ligue 1 side Nantes and German Bundesliga side 1899 Hoffenheim. Also confirmed was a home friendly against Cardiff City. On 8 June, friendlies against Exeter City and Yeovil Town were confirmed.

Competitions

Overall

Overview

{| class="wikitable" style="text-align: center"
|-
!rowspan=2|Competition
!colspan=8|Record
|-
!
!
!
!
!
!
!
!
|-
| Premier League

|-
| FA Cup

|-
| League Cup

|-
! Total

Premier League

League table

Results summary

Results by matchday

Matches
On 17 June 2015, the fixtures for the forthcoming season were announced.

FA Cup

League Cup

Bournemouth entered in the second round and were drawn away against Hartlepool United. The third round draw was made on 25 August 2015 live on Sky Sports by Charlie Nicholas and Phil Thompson. Bournemouth were drawn away to Preston North End.

Hampshire Senior Cup
On the Hampshire FA website, the second round details were announced; Bournemouth faced Havant & Waterlooville.

References

AFC Bournemouth
AFC Bournemouth seasons